The Washington Handicap was an American Thoroughbred horse race run annually at Laurel Park Racecourse in Laurel, Maryland. Open to horses age three and older, it was contested on dirt over a distance of a mile and a quarter (10 furlongs).

At one time the Washington Handicap was an important event that drew many of the top horses. Winners include several U.S. Racing Hall of Fame inductees including U.S. Triple Crown champions, War Admiral and Whirlaway. Ridden by James Butwell, Roamer, another Hall of Fame inductee, set a new World Record of 1:49 3/5 in winning the 1914 edition.

The race was last run on October 20, 1951, and was won by Charles B. Bohn's gelding, Blue Hills.

Records
Speed record:
 2:02.20 @ 1¼ miles - Abstract (1950)

Most wins:
 2 - Sun Beau (1929, 1930)

Most wins by a jockey:
 3 - Frank Coltiletti (1926, 1929, 1930)

Most wins by a trainer:
 2 - James G. Rowe Sr. (1915, 1923)
 2 - Gwyn R. Tompkins (1922, 1937
 2 - William Irvine (1929, 1932)
 2 - Gwyn R. Tompkins (1942, 1945)

Most wins by an owner:
 3 - Glen Riddle Farm (1922, 1924, 1937)
 3 - Walter M. Jeffords Sr. (1926, 1935, 1947)

Winners

References

Discontinued horse races in the United States
Horse races in Maryland
Recurring sporting events established in 1911
Recurring events disestablished in 1951
1911 establishments in Maryland
1951 disestablishments in Maryland